Martin Silvestre Boulard (16 May 1748 in Montlouis (Cher) – 1809) was a French printer-bookseller

Works 
1791: Manuel de l'imprimeur 
1791: La Vie et les aventures de Ferdinand Vertamond... under the pseudonym "M. B. I. L. et E." = "Martin Boulard, imprimeur, libraire et éditeur". 
1793: Considérations importantes sur la déchéance du Roi, et les circonstances actuelles
1804: Traité élémentaire de Bibliographie.

External links 
Martin Silvestre Boulard on data.bnf.fr

French printers
French bibliographers
1748 births
1809 deaths